Jamil Benouahi (born 30 March 1979 in Fez) is a Moroccan former football player and the current manager of Saudi Arabian club Jeddah.

Benouahi have spent most of his playing career in Belgium, obtaining Belgian nationality after arriving in the country in 1997. From the start of his career, the young defensive midfielder turned to the other side of the mirror training young people, the bench. 25 years later he saw his first real experience as a head coach in a big club at USM Alger.

Career

Managerial career
On February 9, 2022, USM Alger contracted with Zlatko Krmpotić to be the new coach and to be his assistant Jamil Benouahi. and with the successive negative results Achour Djelloul, the club’s president, decided to dismiss Krmpotić from his position. and decided to rely on his assistant Benouahi to complete the season. His start was good as Benouahi led the club to its first victory after two months, after which in the Algiers Derby, Benouahi achieved an important and unexpected victory that allows the club to search for a continental participation, and after the fifth win in a row Benouahi stated that he wishes to stay in the club, but the decision is up to them and that he has become a fan of this team. At the end of the season Benouahi declared that they had a difficult week after the death of Billel Benhammouda. and we achieved the goal of qualifying for the Confederation Cup next season, and that he would return to his family and see his children and wait for the administration's decision about his future. On July 6, 2022, it is official Benouahi extended his contract for another year to remain the head coach for the new season. On August 4, 2022 The leaders of USM Alger have put an end to the functions of the technical staff of Benouahi, were dismissed from their posts after a hearing before the disciplinary board.

On 18 February 2023, Benouahi was appointed as manager of Saudi Arabian club Jeddah.

Managerial statistics

References

External links
 

1979 births
Living people
Moroccan football managers
USM Alger managers
Algerian Ligue Professionnelle 1 managers
Moroccan footballers
Moroccan expatriate sportspeople in Belgium
Expatriate footballers in Belgium
R. Wallonia Walhain Chaumont-Gistoux players
R.A.A. Louviéroise players
UR La Louvière Centre players
K Beerschot VA players
Belgian Pro League players
K.R.C. Mechelen players
Francs Borains players
Saudi First Division League managers
Expatriate football managers in Saudi Arabia
Moroccan expatriate sportspeople in Saudi Arabia